Véronique et son cancre (Veronique and Her Dunce) is a short comedy film by Éric Rohmer, which he directed before his series of Six Moral Tales (Contes moraux). It records the meeting of a young woman called Véronique with a difficult boy she has been hired to coach. The encounter raises questions about the value in later life of the teaching used in schools and about the treatment of children who are either unwilling or genuinely unable to learn.

Plot
Véronique arrives to give Jean-Christophe extra tuition. The boy is not enthusiastic, treating her disrespectfully and answering almost every question with an irritating "dunno". In arithmetic it is doubtful if he is grasping the principles, but he throws her off balance with some disconcerting questions. She also has to keep slipping off her new shoes (which she has bought in order to look smart) because they are too tight. When it comes to composition, he seems to lack imagination but again makes some sharp observations. Both are glad when the session ends.

References

External links 

 

French short films
Films directed by Éric Rohmer
1958 films
French black-and-white films
1958 short films
1950s French-language films
1950s French films